Herbert Crook (born July 26, 1965) is a retired American basketball player.  He was a standout at the University of Louisville.  He was a starter on the Cardinals' 1986 national championship team and was Metro Conference player of the year as a junior.

College career
Crook, a 6'7" forward from Louisville, Kentucky and attended  Westport High School during his freshman year and then to Eastern High School. He played at Louisville for Hall of Fame coach Denny Crum.  Crook was a three-year starter, and played for Louisville's national championship team in 1986, averaging 11.8 points and 6.5 assists that year.  As a junior, Crook was named Metro Conference player of the year after 16.1 points, 6.5 rebounds and 3.4 assists per game.  Crook finished his career in the top ten in a number of career statistical categories, including points, rebounds, minutes played, games played, field goals, free throws and free throw attempts.

Professional career
Following the completion of his college career, Crook was drafted by the Indiana Pacers in the third round (61st pick) of the 1988 NBA Draft.  However, Crook never played in the NBA. Crook did play two seasons in the Continental Basketball Association. He averaged 11.7 points and 6.4 rebounds over 56 games with four different teams. He played four seasons in the Finnish Korisliiga, averaging 27.0 points and 10.6 rebounds in 112 games. He won the Korisliiga championship in 1992 and led the league in scoring and rebounds the same year.

References

External links
Korisliiga statistics at korisliiga.fi

1965 births
Living people
African-American basketball players
American expatriate basketball people in Finland
American men's basketball players
Basketball players from Louisville, Kentucky
Grand Rapids Hoops players
Indiana Pacers draft picks
La Crosse Catbirds players
Louisville Cardinals men's basketball players
Quad City Thunder players
Small forwards
Tulsa Fast Breakers players
21st-century African-American people
20th-century African-American sportspeople